Mediacoach is a proprietary video motion analysis tool developed by Spanish media company, Mediapro, for the 42 football clubs of the Liga de Fútbol Profesional.

The stadium-based software uses 16 cameras placed all around the stadium to carry out post-match analysis of player movement. Each system cost €400,000 to install.

Alternate meaning
A media coach is person who gives feedback and instruction to someone who going to be interviewed by the media. The goal of media coaching is to improve the coaching recipient's content, branding and delivery. If the person being coached is going to be interviewed on television perhaps his or her clothing and other aspects of their physical appearance may also receive recommendation for change by the media coach. People running for elected positions such as president of the United States may get a speech coach or media coach to help them improve the way they are perceived via various media outlets. Book authors, corporate officers and corporate spokespersons may also hire a media coach.

References

Film and video technology
La Liga